Leonard Asheim (1877–1961) was a German-American Jewish architect from Connecticut. He was especially noted as an architect of schools.

Born in Germany, Asheim later came to the United States, locating in Waterbury, Connecticut. He worked for Joseph A. Jackson for three years, before going to Boston, where he took evening classes in architecture at the Massachusetts Institute of Technology, while working days for architects in that city. Asheim first opened his office in Waterbury in 1898. He quickly began to specialize in school buildings, a part of his practice that continued after his move to Bridgeport in 1909.

In 1945 he went to New Haven, leaving his office in the care of loyal assistant Oliver Wilkins. At this time, Asheim moved to a consulting position. In the 1950s he also went to Florida, but soon returned to Bridgeport. At his death in 1961, he was the oldest architect in the city.

Architectural work

 1902 - Mulcahy School, Fairmount & Lounsbury Sts, Waterbury, Connecticut
 Demolished
 1909 - Davis School, 26 Davis St, Oakville, Connecticut
 Demolished in 2012
 1910 - Leonard Asheim House, 2345 North Ave, Bridgeport, Connecticut
 1910 - Sheridan School, 280 Tesiny Ave, Bridgeport, Connecticut
 1911 - Park Avenue Temple, 1100 Park Ave, Bridgeport, Connecticut
 1912 - Whittier School, 86 Whittier St, Bridgeport, Connecticut
 1916 - Mrs. Bernard Blumberg House, 56 Lyon Ter, Bridgeport, Connecticut
 1916 - Maplewood Junior High School, 240 Linwood Ave, Bridgeport, Connecticut
 1917 - Fairfield Avenue Fire/Police Station, 2676 Fairfield Ave, Bridgeport, Connecticut
 1917 - Welfare Building, Washington & Madison Aves, Bridgeport, Connecticut
 Demolished in the 1990s
 1919 - West Side Bank Building, 1460 State St, Bridgeport, Connecticut
 1921 - Temple Israel, 100 Willow St, Waterbury, Connecticut
 Demolished
 1922 - Newfield Branch Library, 755 Central Ave, Bridgeport, Connecticut
 1922 - West End Branch Library, 1705 Fairfield Ave, Bridgeport, Connecticut
 1926 - Achavath Achim Synagogue, 725 Hancock Ave, Bridgeport, Connecticut
 1928 - Central Fire Station, 72 New Haven Ave, Milford, Connecticut
 1932 - Ferdinand Frassinelli House, 33 Eames Blvd, Bridgeport, Connecticut
 1936 - Milford Courthouse, 14 W River St, Milford, Connecticut
 1938 - Klein Memorial Auditorium, 910 Fairfield Ave, Bridgeport, Connecticut
 1939 - Orcutt Boys' Club, 102 Park St, Bridgeport, Connecticut

References

1877 births
1961 deaths
Architects from Bridgeport, Connecticut
Architects from Waterbury, Connecticut
20th-century American architects
Emigrants from the German Empire to the United States